The Department of Trade and Resources was an Australian government department that existed between December 1977 and March 1983.

Scope
Information about the department's functions and/or government funding allocation could be found in the Administrative Arrangements Orders, the annual Portfolio Budget Statements and in the Department's annual reports.

At its creation, the Department was responsible for the following:
Trade and commerce with other countries including 
Trade promotion, including the publication of Overseas Trading
Trade agreements
Export services
Commercial development and marketing of minerals (including uranium) and hydrocarbon fuels.

Structure
The Department was a Commonwealth Public Service department, staffed by officials who were responsible to the Minister for National Trade and Resources, Doug Anthony. The Secretary of the Department was J. Sully.

References

Ministries established in 1977
Trade and Resources